Former State Route 429 (SR 429), also known as Airbase Road, was a south-to-north secondary highway in Blount County, Tennessee, that was 1.85 miles (3.0 km) long. Its southern terminus was at the Tennessee Air National Guard gate and the northern terminus was with US 129/SR 115 (Airport Highway). The road was decommissioned in 2009 when the Tennessee Air National Guard gate was moved, and Airbase Road was rerouted on new construction to the west, making the old road private. The entire route of SR 429 was signed when it existed.

Major intersections

References

External links
Tennessee Department of Transportation

429